Pivierda is one of 13 parishes (administrative divisions) in the Colunga municipality, within the province and autonomous community of Asturias, in northern Spain. 

The population is 79 (INE 2007).

Villages
 Agüera Riba
 Bucial
 Corrales
 Tizagua

References

Parishes in Colunga